Evergreen Cemetery is a historic cemetery in the Brighton neighborhood of Boston, Massachusetts. It was established in 1850 by the town of Brighton (which was annexed to Boston in 1874), and was laid out in the then-fashionable rural cemetery style inspired by Mount Auburn Cemetery in Cambridge. Its entrance gate was built in 1892, and its Jacobethan office building was added in 1903. Boston architect James Mulcahy designed the office building. The older portions of the cemetery are characterized by winding lanes (now paved, originally gravel), with outcrops of Roxbury puddingstone.

The cemetery was listed the National Register of Historic Places in 2009.

Notable interments
 Richard Hamilton Taylor, Medal of Honor recipient 
 William Wirt Warren, US Congressman 1875–77
 Horatio Julius Homer, 1st African American Boston Police Officer 1848–1923

Gallery

See also
 List of cemeteries in Boston, Massachusetts
 National Register of Historic Places listings in southern Boston, Massachusetts

References

External links
 
 
 City of Boston – Evergreen Cemetery

Cemeteries on the National Register of Historic Places in Massachusetts
Cemeteries in Brighton, Boston
National Register of Historic Places in Boston
Rural cemeteries
Cemeteries established in the 1850s